The 2011–12 Biathlon World Cup – World Cup 3 was held in Hochfilzen, Austria, from 15 December until 18 December 2011. This was the second World Cup event in Hochfilzen in 2011–12 season, due to the lack of snow in Annecy.

Schedule of events 
The time schedule of the event stands below

Medal winners

Men

Women

Mixed

Achievements

 Best performance for all time

 , 3rd place in Sprint
 , 4th place in Sprint
 , 9th place in Sprint
 , 11th place in Sprint
 , 20th place in Sprint
 , 33rd place in Sprint
 , 34th place in Sprint
 , 69th place in Sprint
 , 6th place in Sprint
 , 10th place in Sprint
 , 16th place in Sprint 
 , 21st place in Sprint
 , 25th place in Sprint and 24th place in Pursuit
 , 41st place in Sprint
 , 40th place in Pursuit

 First World Cup race

 , 104th place in Sprint
 , 34th place in Sprint
 , 35th place in Sprint
 , 46th place in Sprint

References 

World Cup 3
2011 in Austrian sport
December 2011 sports events in Europe
2011-12 Biathlon World Cup
Sport in Tyrol (state)